HSBC Bank Australia Limited (formerly the HongkongBank of Australia Limited) is the Australian subsidiary of HSBC. The bank offers a wide range of financial services in Australia through a network of 36 branches and offices. These services include retail and commercial banking, financial planning, trade finance, treasury and financial markets, payments and cash management and securities custody.

HSBC Bank Australia was granted a banking licence in 1986, although the bank had originally established an Australian presence as Hongkong Finance Ltd in 1964. It is a foreign bank in Australia, offering a wide range of banking products and services to the retail, commercial, corporate and institutional sectors.

The bank's headquarters is located in Barangaroo, a suburb in central Sydney.

History

HSBC was granted an Australian banking licence in 1986, after the Australian federal government changed the rules to allow foreign banks into the country. HSBC was not the first foreign bank to enter Australia, the first was Chase-AMP, but HSBC was one of the first foreign entrants into the business banking sector.

1986 — launched Commercial Financial Services
1991 — launched Personal Financial Services
1992 — began to be profitable after several years of losses
1995 — introduced discount home loans in Australia
1997 — introduced telephone banking and credit cards 
1998 — established HSBC InvestDirect (Australia) Limited
 — introduced financial planning services in Australia
2001 — acquired NRMA Building Society Limited 
 — launched internet banking for personal customers in Australia
2005 — sold Australian asset management business to Challenger Financial Services
2006 — sold broker originated mortgage book to Firstmac 
 — acquired Westpac sub-custody business in Australia and New Zealand 
 — sold margin lending portfolio to St. George 
 — sold Australian online stockbroking business to E-Trade
2008 — established Global Investments business

Products and services

Bank accounts
HSBC offers a wide range of bank accounts in Australia, including transaction and savings accounts, term deposits and foreign currency accounts.

All of HSBC's transaction accounts include a linked Visa Debit card, fee-free access to over 3000 ATMs Australia-wide, which include those from HSBC and banks that offer access to fee-free ATMs, access to mobile and internet banking, and are rated 5 stars for outstanding value by Canstar.

HSBC Premier, which is available in Australia and in other markets within the HSBC Group, is a premium banking service that is available for its wealthy clients, and includes a personal financial planner service, an online share trading platform and SMSF assistance to advise upon all types of personal and business investments.

Credit cards
HSBC credit cards include low rate, low fee and rewards cards, with features including low interest rates and annual fees, balance transfer offers and an ability to earn HSBC Rewards points which can be redeemed for a range of products and services, or Qantas Points towards the Qantas Frequent Flyer program.

Home loans
HSBC home loans feature flexible repayment plans, a personal relationship manager and the ability to easily switch a home loan from another bank.

Personal loans
HSBC personal loans provide the ability to borrow money when needed for a range of situations. Applications can be completed online, with quick approval and transfer of funds, along with fixed repayments. HSBC's personal loans were rated an expert's choice by Mozo for Overall Value.

Insurance
HSBC Insurance products include general home and contents or landlord insurance, car insurance, life insurance including critical illness cover and life cover, as well as travel insurance, issued by Allianz Australia Life Insurance Limited.

See also

 Banking in Australia
 List of banks
 List of banks in Australia
 List of banks in Oceania
 Reserve Bank of Australia
 Australian Prudential Regulation Authority
 Australian Securities and Investments Commission

References

External links
 HSBC Bank Australia website
 HSBC Group website
 HSBC New Zealand

Australia
Banks of Australia
Financial services companies based in Sydney
Australian subsidiaries of foreign companies
Banks established in 1985
Australian companies established in 1985